is a tombolo in Higashi-ku, Fukuoka, Fukuoka Prefecture, Japan. It connects Kyushu Island and Shikanoshima Island. It is 8km in length and up to 2.5 km in width. Its northern coast borders Genkai Sea and its southern coast Hakata Bay. There are many resorts.
Most of the area is covered with sand hills but there is a terrace on the Northern side of the tombolo, where sands are believed to have been deposited during the Pleistocene.

Geography of Fukuoka
Cross country running venues
Shoals of Japan